Brooks is a city in southeast Alberta, Canada that is surrounded by the County of Newell. Brooks has the highest proportion of Black Canadians of any census subdivision in Canada.

History 
The area that is now Brooks was used as a bison-hunting ground for the Blackfoot and Crow. After Treaty 7 was signed in 1877, homesteaders took advantage of the  Dominion Lands Act to move into the area to begin farming. Before 1904, the area still did not have a name. Through a contest sponsored by the Postmaster General, the area was named after Noel Edgell Brooks, a Canadian Pacific Railway Divisional Engineer from Calgary.

Brooks was incorporated as a village on July 14, 1910, and then as a town on September 8, 1911. Its population in the 1911 Census of Canada was 486.

In the 1996 Census, the population of Brooks reached 10,093 making it eligible for city status. Brooks incorporated as a city on September 1, 2005 when its official population was 11,604.

In 2010, Brooks celebrated the centennial of its incorporation as a village in 1910.

Demographics 

A multicultural community, Brooks has been referred to as "The City of 100 Hellos" as a result of a documentary by Brandy Yanchyk profiling the community's significant immigrant, refugee and temporary foreign worker populations. The documentary was called Brooks – The City of 100 Hellos and was created in 2010 for Omni Television. The community's multicultural character was also the subject of a 2007 National Film Board of Canada documentary, 24 Days in Brooks, directed by Dana Inkster.

Geography 

Brooks is located in the Grassland Natural Region of Alberta. The area surrounding Brooks is dry mixed grass/shortgrass prairie.

Climate 
Located in the steppe region known as the Palliser's Triangle, Brooks has a semi-arid climate (Köppen climate classification BSk). Winters are quite dry and cold, with little snowfall compared to the rest of Canada. Chinook winds, though less common than in areas west and especially southwest of Brooks, are not uncommon, and ameliorate the cold winter temperatures temporarily when they pass over. Wide diurnal temperature ranges are regular, due to the aridity and moderately high elevation. Low humidity is prevalent throughout the year. Most of the relatively scant annual precipitation occurs in late spring and summer, often in the form of thunderstorms.

Economy 
The base of the economy of the City of Brooks is energy (oil and gas) and agriculture, with other sectors including metal manufacturing, food processing and construction. It is also a retail and service centre for the surrounding area.

Canada’s second largest beef-processing facility, owned by JBS Canada, is located in Brooks and ships meat across the country and internationally. In 2012, while the plant was owned by XL Foods, it released meat contaminated with E. coli, and was shut down for a month. The plant has over 2000 employees.

Attractions 
The JBS Leisure Centre is the area's main recreation centre. It includes one arena, a curling rink, an aquatic centre with a waterslide and wave pool, a gymnasium, a fitness centre, and multipurpose rooms. The complex was renovated in 2005 and again in 2016. Now the Brooks Public Library is within the JBS Leisure Centre.

In 2010, the Duke of Sutherland Park was redeveloped. It features baseball diamonds, a soccer field, a playground and a  waterpark with spray features for toddlers and a play structure for older children.

Also in 2010, the Centennial Regional Arena was completed after nearly a decade of planning and 18 months of construction. The multi-purpose facility seats 1,704 people. It includes corporate boxes, a running track, concessions, and a  surface. The arena is home to several user groups, including the Brooks Bandits. The arena also hosted the 2019 National Junior A Championship.

There are three provincial parks in the area: Dinosaur Provincial Park, a World Heritage Site, to the northeast, Tillebrook Provincial Park to the east and Kinbrook Island Provincial Park to the south. In addition, there are several other recreational sites in the area including the Rolling Hills Reservoir, Crawling Valley Reservoir, and Emerson Bridge.

The Brooks Aqueduct southeast of Brooks was built to transport irrigation water across the Eastern Irrigation District.

Sports 
Brooks is home to the Brooks Bandits of the Alberta Junior Hockey League. The ice hockey team was awarded to Brooks in 1998 and embarked on its first season in 2000. They have helped produce current NHL players such as Cale Makar (Colorado Avalanche) and Chad Johnson. The Bandits won the league championship in 2012, 2013, 2016, 2017 and 2019. They won their first National Championship (The Royal Bank Cup) in 2013 and repeated again by winning the National Junior A Championship in 2019. They

There are threefootball teams in Brooks: from the public schools the Roadrunners  the Buffalos and the Crusaders from the catholic schools. The teams comprise players from the local junior and senior high schools respectively. The Buffalos represented Brooks at provincial championships in 1989, 1995, 1997, and 2009, winning in the title in its last three appearances. The Roadrunners appeared at provincial championships in 1995, 2004, 2007, 2014, and 2016 . The Crusaders have appeared in the provincial finals three times 2015,2016 and 2018 winning in 2018.

Brooks is home to a Western Canadian Baseball League franchise named the Brooks Bombers. They play at Elks Field in the Quad Ball Diamond Complex.

Government 
Brooks City Council consists of one mayor and six councillors. The last election was held in October 2017. John Petrie has been mayor since 2021.

Education 
Brooks has three high schools, three junior high schools, five elementary schools, three primary schools, and two alternative schools. The schools are operated by Grasslands Public Schools, Christ the Redeemer School Division (Catholic) and Francosud (Francophone). Brooks also has a satellite campus of Medicine Hat College. The Brooks Public Library was established in 1951.

Health care
Acute medical care is provided at the Brooks Health Centre.
The Brooks Health Centre is under the Alberta Health Services which provides health to most of Alberta

Media 
Brooks is served by two radio stations, CIBQ-FM (105.7 Real Country), and CIXF-FM (Boom 101.1). Both stations are owned by Stingray Group.

Brooks has two distinct newspapers. The Brooks Bulletin is published every Tuesday, and has served Brooks and the County of Newell since 1910. It has a weekly circulation of 4,332 and is a paid subscription product.

The Weekend Regional is a second paper the Bulletin established in 2004 and it is published on Fridays. As of January 2010, it became a total market coverage product with a weekly circulation of 11,235.

Notable people 
 Sheri Forde, TSN Toronto reporter
 Little Miss Higgins, folk and blues singer
 Ryan Peake, a member of rock band Nickelback
 Sherraine Schalm, Olympic fencer
 Harnarayan Singh, NHL broadcaster
 Monte Solberg, former federal cabinet minister, current political columnist for Sun Media 
 Barry Morishita, former mayor of Brooks.

See also 
List of cities in Alberta
List of communities in Alberta
Canada's Stonehenge

References

External links 

 
1910 establishments in Alberta
Cities in Alberta
Populated places established in 1910